Multiple publications exist under the name Wavelength Magazine. 'Wavelength' is a worldwide surfing magazine published by WL Media, based in Newquay, Cornwall. Another 'Wavelength Magazine' is a sea kayaking magazine published on Vancouver Island, British Columbia, Canada, with distribution throughout Canada and the United States and available free online. The Canadian magazine was founded in 1991 on Gabriola Island, British Columbia, and is now published in Nanaimo.

External links

 Wavelength Magazine
 Wavelength Magazine

Sports magazines published in the United Kingdom
Magazines established in 1991
Mass media in Cornwall
Surfing magazines
Surfing in the United Kingdom
1991 establishments in the United Kingdom